Fisherman Island is a small uninhabited island off the coast of New Zealand. It is contained within Abel Tasman National Park and adjacent to Motuareronui / Adele Island.

In August 2014, the name of the neighboring island was officially altered to Motuareronui / Adele Island. Motu means island, arero is a tongue and nui is big; hence, Motuareronui literally means the big island shaped like a tongue, which makes Motuareroiti / Fisherman Island (with iti meaning little) the little island shaped like a tongue; however, in his comprehensive book on natural and cultural history of Abel Tasman National Park, Philip Simpson suggests the two islands are incorrectly named, as follows:

See also

 Desert island
 List of islands

References

Islands of the Tasman District
Abel Tasman National Park
Uninhabited islands of New Zealand
Tasman Bay